Mohamed Garrana Rifaat  (b. Cairo, January 29, 1924; surname also spelled Garana) is an Egyptian composer of classical music, a member of that nation's second generation of such composers.

He began playing the trumpet at age 12, studying it later at the Institute for Dramatic Music. He later studied with Hans Hickmann and Menato in Cairo.

His works feature the juxtaposition of Egyptian traditional and religious music with Western music. He has composed orchestral works (including several symphonic poems). His concerto for qanun and orchestra is the first composition to combine this Arabic instrument with symphony orchestra.

In addition to his compositional activities, he served as director of the music division of Egyptian television.

His daughter, the flutist Maha Garrana, has performed his music.

Compositions
Oriental Dance, flute and string orchestra
Concerto for Qanun and Orchestra
Port Said - A Symphonic Poem
The Nile - A Symphonic Poem
Fugue for Clarinet and Strings
Meditations from "El Nouba"

External links
Rifaat Garrana page
Rifaat Garrana page (Arabic)

See also
List of Egyptian composers

1924 births
Egyptian composers
20th-century classical composers
Musicians from Cairo
Living people
Male classical composers
20th-century male musicians